Pop Art, Inc. is an independently owned American marketing agency located in Portland, Oregon. Founded in 1997, Pop Art’s most prominent clients include Daimler Trucks North America and Yogi Tea.

Products
Pop Art provides services in the software development and digital marketing industries, including custom software, enterprise software, mobile application development, digital asset management, responsive web design, user experience design, content marketing, and social media marketing.

Awards
In 2013, Pop Art was recognized by Portland Business Journal as the 7th largest digital marketing company by gross income and the 22nd largest marketing firm overall by gross income in Oregon.

In 2004, Pop Art was named Business of the Year for Oregon and Southwest Washington in the Small Business category by the Better Business Bureau.

Pop Art has been named among Oregon Business’ 100 Best Places to Work a total of six times: in 2002, 2003, 2005, 2006, 2012, and 2016.

Portland Business Journal has listed Pop Art in its 100 Fastest Growing Private Companies a total of four times: in 2002, 2006, 2007, and 2008.

See also
List of companies based in Oregon
Silicon Forest

References

Companies based in Portland, Oregon
1997 establishments in Oregon